Yekaterinburg TV Tower was a tall incomplete structure in Yekaterinburg, Russia.

Until the year 2000 it was illegally used for buildering and BASE jumping. After several fatal accidents and suicides it was sealed.

The tower was demolished on 24 March 2018, as part of a city beautification programme in preparation for the 2018 World Cup.

See also
 List of towers

Notes

External links

Behold the tallest abandoned building in the world
 https://web.archive.org/web/20071001090316/http://usa.ural.ru/v2/pics/panorama/yekat2003/o_tv.htm 
 

Towers in Russia
Unfinished buildings and structures
Buildings and structures in Yekaterinburg
Radio masts and towers
2018 disestablishments in Russia
Buildings and structures demolished in 2018
Buildings and structures demolished by controlled implosion
Demolished buildings and structures in Russia